Neri Maria Corsini (19 May 1685 – 6 December 1770) was an Italian nobleman and Catholic priest and cardinal.

Life
Born in Florence, Corsini was the second of the two sons of Filippo Corsini and Lucrezia Rinuccini. He traveled widely through Europe between 1709–1713. Following this, he was appointed to serve as the ambassador of the Grand Duchy of Tuscany to France in 1709, followed by serving that same office in England. He acted as Minister Plenipotentiary to the negotiations which resulted in the Treaty of the Hague in 1720.

After the death of his patron, Grand Duke Cosimo III de' Medici in 1723, Corsini moved to Rome, where in 1726 he became the secretary of his uncle, Cardinal Lorenzo Corsini, serving him until his election as pope, under the name of Pope Clement XII in 1730. His uncle then named him a cardinal deacon in pectore at the consistory of 14 August 1730. His creation as cardinal was made public in December of that same year, and he was given as his titular church the Church of S. Adriano — which was deconsecrated in 1946 and returned to its archaeological state as the Roman Senate House.

After this, Corsini donated the library of the Agonal Palace, his uncle's former residence, to the Holy See and opened his open library to the public. He then exercised several roles in the Roman Curia. He was also persuaded to seek Holy Orders, becoming a priest in 1733, after which he was named Prefect of the Supreme Tribunal of the Apostolic Signatura.

In 1736 Corsini bought an ancient estate in Rome on which he had built the Palazzo Corsini. He opted to exchange his titular church for that of the Basilica of Sant'Eustachio, at which he had built an elaborate altar to hold the remains of its patron saint. His uncle called upon him to settle a dispute with the Kingdom of Portugal which resulted in a concordat with that state. In 1737 he was named the Protector of Ireland.

In 1740 Corsini took part in the conclave of 1740 at which Pope Benedict XIV was elected, by whom he was immediately named Archpriest of the Basilica of St. John Lateran (1740-1770). He also participated in the Conclave of 1758, which elected Pope Clement XIII, and the Conclave of 1769 which elected Pope Clement XIV. From 1753 until his death in 1770 he was Secretary of the Roman Inquisition.

Corsini died at his palace on 6 December 1770 at the age of eighty-five. He was buried in the Corsini Chapel in the Basilica of St. John Lateran.

References

Sources 
 Page on cardinal Neri Maria Corsini, by Salvador Miranda,  The Cardinals of the Holy Roman Church Retrieved: 2016-03-12.
 Mario Guarnacci, Vitae et res gestae Pontificum Romanorum et S.R.E. Cardinalium  Tomus secundus (Romae Venantii Monaldini, 1751), pp. 603–606.
 Lorenzo Cardella,  Memorie storiche de' cardinali della Santa Romana Chiesa  Volume VIII (Roma: Pagliari 1794), pp. 244–246.
 Enzo Borsellino, Palazzo Corsini alla Lungara: storia di un cantiere (Fasano: Schena, 1988).
 Enzo Borsellino, Palazzo Corsini: Roma (Roma: Istituto poligrafico e Zecca dello Stato, Libreria dello Stato, 1995).
 George L. Williams, Papal Genealogy: The Families and Descendants of the Popes (Jefferson, N.C., USA: McFarland, 2004), pp. 127–128.

1685 births
1770 deaths
Clergy from Florence
Neri
Cardinal-nephews
18th-century Italian cardinals
Prefects of the Apostolic Signatura
Roman Inquisition
Burials at the Archbasilica of Saint John Lateran
Diplomats from Florence